Galaagu, also spelled Kalarko and Kallaargu (and also known as Malpa), is a Pama–Nyungan language of Western Australia. It has recently been classified as the closest relative of the Nyungar languages.

See also
Mirning languages

References

Nyungic languages
Goldfields-Esperance